Namie can refer to:

Places 

 Namie, Fukushima
 Namie Station

People

Given name 
Namie (nɑːmiˈeɪ / NAH-mee-AY) is Japanese given name for females. Its meaning, as with all Japanese names, depends on the kanji used to spell it.

Namie Amuro (born 1977), Japanese singer
Namie Odama (born 1979), Japanese mangaka
Namie Shimabukuro (born 1998), Japanese professional footballer

Surname 

 Gary Namie, American psychologist
 Ruth F. Namie, American psychologist

Fictional characters 

Namie, character in the Marvel Universe
Namie Amamiya, character in Forest of Piano
 Namie Yagiri, character in Durarara!!

Japanese feminine given names